Feng Zhe (born in 1975), is a male former Chinese and Bulgarian international table tennis player. He later became a Bulgarian citizen and represented Bulgaria at table tennis.

He won a silver medal at the 1999 World Table Tennis Championships in the mixed doubles with Sun Jin.

See also
 List of table tennis players

References

Bulgarian male table tennis players
Bulgarian people of Chinese descent
Living people
1975 births
Chinese male table tennis players
Table tennis players from Shanghai
Naturalised table tennis players
World Table Tennis Championships medalists